Brian Stelfreeze is an American comic book artist. Stelfreeze is a painter, penciller, inker and colorist and has worked for nearly every major American comic book publisher. He is one of the original members of Atlanta's Gaijin Studios.

Career
Stelfreeze began his career as the artist of the sci-fi miniseries CyCops in the mid-1980s.

While Stelfreeze has been known throughout his career primarily as a cover artist, painting more than fifty cover illustrations for DC Comics' Shadow of the Bat, he's also produced a significant amount of sequential work, most notably of late with the miniseries Domino for Marvel Comics and Matador for DC Comics' Wildstorm imprint.

Currently, Stelfreeze acts as art director for 12 Gauge Comics and occasionally has provided artwork for their series The Ride, and its prequel, Gun Candy.  His latest work can be seen on the Walt Simonson-written Demon/Catwoman feature in DC Comics' Wednesday Comics.

Stelfreeze is the artist on the 2016 revival of Marvel's Black Panther with writer Ta-Nehisi Coates.

In 2020 Stelfreeze launched Thomas River, a spy series with a 40-page first issue. He created the art for the series, and co-wrote the series with Doug Wagner. The first issue was crowdfunded through Kickstarter, surpassed its funding stretch goal of $30,000, and was published by 12 Gauge Comics.

Awards 
 2014 Inkpot Award
 2017 Glyph Comics Award for "Best Artist" (for Black Panther)

References

External links 
 
 12 Gauge Comics Official Site
 Brian Stelfreeze's Marvel Portfolio

Year of birth missing (living people)
Living people
American comics artists
Artists from Atlanta
African-American comics creators
American comics creators
20th-century American artists
21st-century American artists
20th-century African-American artists
21st-century African-American artists